Rasaq Malik Gbolahan is a Nigerian poet and essayist. With Ọ̀rẹ́dọlá Ibrahim, Malik is the co-founder of Àtẹ́lẹwọ́, the first digital journal devoted to publishing works written in the Yorùbá language. He was the founding Editor-in-Chief of Agbowó.

Education 
Malik earned his bachelor's and master's degrees in English Language at the University of Ibadan, Nigeria in 2013 and 2017 respectively.

Works 
Malik is the author of two poetry chapbooks: No Home In This Land, which was selected for a chapbook box edited by Kwame Dawes and Chris Abani in 2018, and The Other Names of Grief, published in 2021 by Konya Shamsrumi, an African poetry press which he formed with four other Nigerian poets in November 2017. His poems, which often come off as dirges, threnodies, elegies and such other melancholic typologies of poetry, have attracted wide reviews on different literary platforms such as Open Country Mag, Olongo Africa, and African Writer Magazine, Qwenu! and in national dailies for example Daily Trust, TheCable Lifestyle.

Malik's poems have appeared in many literary journals and mediums including African American Review, Colorado Review, Crab Orchard Review, LitHub, Michigan Quarterly Review, Minnesota Review, New Orleans Review, Prairie Schooner, Poet Lore, Rattle, Verse Daily, among several others. His essays have also been published in mediums such as Olongo Africa and Agbowó. Rasaq was one of 126 established and emerging African poets who contributed to Wreaths for a Wayfarer, an anthology mourning the tragic death of Nigerian-Canadian academic and public intellectual Pius Adesanmi in a March 2019 Ethiopian Airlines plane crash. He, alongside 31 other poets, also contributed to Sọ̀rọ̀sókè: An #EndSARS Anthology, edited by Nigerian writers Jumoke Verissimo and James Yéku. Published in February 2022, the collection memorialized the End SARS protests against police brutality in Nigeria.

Malik has been profiled and or interviewed on platforms such as The Shallow Tales Review, CỌ́N-SCÌÒ Magazine, Africa in Dialogue and Gainsayer.

Malik won Honorable Mention in 2015 Best of the Net for his poem "Elegy", published in One. Rattle nominated his poems "How My Mother Spends Her Nights" and "What My Children Remember" for the Pushcart Prize in 2016 and 2019 respectively. He was shortlisted for Brunel International African Poetry Prize in 2017. He was a finalist for Sillerman First Book for African Poets in 2018.

Malik regularly shares his work on his social media handles.

References 

1992 births
Living people
University of Ibadan alumni
21st-century Nigerian poets
Nigerian essayists
Yoruba-language writers
Writers from Oyo State
Nigerian editors